Nehran or Nahran or Nakhran may refer to:

Nahran, East Azerbaijan
Nahran, Hamadan
Nehran, Qazvin